Apataki Airport  is an airport on Apataki Atoll in the Tuamotu Archipelago of French Polynesia. The airport is 200 meters southwest of the village center of Niutahe, the only village of Apataki Atoll.

Airlines and destinations
No scheduled flights as of May 2019.

See also
 List of airports in French Polynesia

References

External links
 Atoll list (in French)
 Classification of the French Polynesian atolls by Salvat (1985)

Airports in French Polynesia
Atolls of the Tuamotus